Monsignor Bonner and Archbishop Prendergast High School is located in Upper Darby Township, Pennsylvania. The school, which is part of the Archdiocese of Philadelphia, was originally two schools on one campus. In February 2012, the Archdiocese of Philadelphia announced that the two schools, Monsignor Bonner, the all boys school and Archbishop Prendergast, the all girls school, would be merged into one building.

The schools, when they were separate, were called Bonner and Prendie.

The schools are named after former superintendent of schools of the diocese John J. Bonner and Archbishop Prendergast.

Campus
The campus is adjacent to, but not within, the Drexel Hill census-designated place. It has a Drexel Hill postal address.

History of Monsignor Bonner High School

More commonly known as Bonner, the all boys Catholic high school was named after Reverend Monsignor John J. Bonner. Monsignor Bonner was born in Philadelphia on November 2, 1880. In 1908, he entered St. Charles Borromeo Seminary and began studying at the North American College in Rome. On June 2, 1917, Monsignor Bonner was ordained in the Basilica of St. John Lateran on June 2, 1917, by Cardinal Pompilii.

After being ordained, Monsignor Bonner became an assistant rector of St. Bridget's Church in Philadelphia. Two years later, In April 1919, he became the assistant principal of Roman Catholic High School in which he had formerly been a student. In August 1926, he was appointed Diocesan Superintendent of Schools and held that position until he died of a heart attack on November 27, 1945.

In 1953, the building that was formerly used as St. Vincent's Orphanage became an all boys high school with the name Archbishop Prendergast High School. In 1956, a new building was opened next door and was named Monsignor Bonner. Bonner then became a school for boys and Archbishop Prendergast became a school for girls.

History of Archbishop Prendergast High School

Archbishop Prendergast High School, also known as Prendie, was named after the Most Reverend Edmond Francis Prendergast, the third Archbishop of Philadelphia. Born in Ireland on May 5, 1843, he immigrated to America at sixteen years of age and entered Saint Charles Seminary. He was ordained at twenty-two years of age. On July 16, 1911, he was consecrated as Auxiliary Bishop of Philadelphia by Archbishop Ryan. Before his death in 1918, Archbishop Prendergast founded Saint Francis Country Home for Convalescents and Saint Edmond's Home for Crippled Children. It was Archbishop Prendergast that was responsible for the construction of St. Vincent's Orphanage, which would later be known as Archbishop Prendergast High School.

Campus history

The land in which Monsignor Bonner and Archbishop Prendergast High School is located was originally owned by Christopher Fallon. In 1850, Fallon built a mansion on the site. In 1882, the mansion was bought by Colonel Anthony Drexel. The mansion was situated on what was then called the hill of Drexel and the area eventually became known as Drexel Hill. The mansion burned to the ground in 1908 with only the gatehouse remaining.

Nine years later, the Archdiocese of Philadelphia purchased the land. Archbishop Edmond Prendergast announced that an orphanage would be built at the former site of the mansion. The orphanage, which would be named St. Vincent's Orphanage, would be run by the Sisters of Charity and would be the home for 500 orphans. Archbishop Prendergast did not get to see the completion of the orphanage. He died in 1918, two years before the dedication of the orphanage took place.

The building was used as an orphanage for over thirty years. As the number of children in the orphanage lessened, Reverend John F. O’Hara made the decision to move the orphans to a smaller building in St. David's. By 1953, the building was transformed into a school for boys.

The schools merge

In 2005, the decision was made by the Office of Catholic Education of the Archdiocese of Philadelphia that Monsignor Bonner High School and Archbishop Prendergast High School would be a co-institutional model with one administration. The new administration would include a single President, Principal and Assistant Principals for Academic Affairs, Student Services, and Student Affairs for both schools. The new model became official in July 2006, with Bonner's President Rev. Augustine Esposito, O.S.A and Prendie's Principal Mrs. Mary Berner, as the President and Principal of the new Monsignor Bonner and Archbishop Prendergast Catholic High School.

In 2007, Mr. William Brannick replaced Mrs. Berner as the principal of the co-institutional school. Two years later, in June 2009, it was announced that the Augustinian Friars, who were part of Monsignor Bonner since the creation of the school, would be leaving the school due to a low number of priests. Father James Olson soon became the school's new president.

The school faced a difficult time in January 2012 when Archbishop Charles J. Chaput announced that Bonner and Prendie would close in June, due to the recommendations of the Blue Ribbon Commission. The basis of the commission's recommendation was founded upon the real estate value of the campuses and their potential income after possible retail development.  Soon after the announcement was made, the Administration began the appeal process which outlined plans for the improvement of Bonner and Prendie. With the support of students, faculty, parents, and Alumni, money was raised to support the schools. In a 13-day span, alumni and supporters donated $1.11 million to keep the school open. Days before the final decision regarding the school was to be made, a group of business people came forward to help not just Bonner and Prendie, but the other high schools destined to close as well. On February 24, 2012, Archbishop Chaput announced that Bonner and Prendie would remain open as one combined school.

The school is still represented by Bonner's mascot, the Friar and Prendie's mascot, the Panda. Homerooms remain single sex as do Theology classes as well as gym/health classes.

Shooting threat
An exchange student from Taiwan named Sun An-tso, the son of actors  and Di Ying, was arrested on March 28, 2018, for threatening to "shoot up" the school. On August 28, he pled guilty and sentenced to time served and deportation.

References

External links 
 
 
 History & Mission

Schools in Delaware County, Pennsylvania
Catholic secondary schools in Pennsylvania